Barinasuchus (meaning "Barinas crocodile," in reference to where the type material was found) is an extinct genus of sebecid mesoeucrocodylian.  Its fossils have been found in middle Eocene-age rocks of the Divisadero Largo Formation of Argentina, middle Miocene-age rocks of the Ipururo Formation of Peru, and middle Miocene-age rocks of the Parángula Formation of Venezuela.

Description 
Barinasuchus was described in 2007 by Alfredo Paolillo and Omar Linares. The holotype comes from the rocks of the Parángula Formation, located in Barinas, Venezuela and consists of an incomplete, articulated skull. Like other sebecosuchians, it was a terrestrial carnivore equipped with ziphodont teeth, remarkably similar to those of theropods, which are compressed laterally, curved facing backwards, and with serrated borders. This dentition made it a formidable predator. 

The preserved parts of the holotype consist of a skull that is 70 centimeters in length and 40 centimeters in height. Based on this, it is estimated that the total skull length was between 95 and 115 centimeters. The total length of the animal is estimated to be close to  based on more complete sebecosuchians like Stratiotosuchus or nearly  based on the modern Crocodylus porosus, making Barinasuchus the largest known sebecid. Without more complete remains, it is difficult to estimate its possible weight; however, based in the lengths of Stratiosuchus mexhechti and Crocodylus porosus, it has been estimated that Barinasuchus weighed around 1,610 and 1,720 kilograms respectively. This implies a superior weight than any of the large carnivoran mammals, and even considering a margin error of 50%, would still make it larger than any terrestrial mammalian predator of the Cenozoic.

Fossils of the same age found in Peru previously assigned to Sebecus cf. huilensis were assigned to the type species, B. arveloi.

Classification 
In 2014, Diego Pol and his colleagues made a phylogenetic analysis, integrating many of the new genera and species found in the early 2010s. Compiling various phylogenetic studies in order to make a matrix that included 109 genera of Crocodyliforms, of which 412 morphological characteristics were studied. Notosuchia according to Diego Pol et al. includes 45 genera and 54 species. In their cladogram, Barinasuchus is classified as a Sebecosuchian belonging to the family Sebecidae, close to the Lorosuchus genus and forms a sister taxon to the genera of Ayllusuchus and Bretesuchus, indicating that Barinasuchus belonged to a distant, basal lineage within the family.

Cladogram based on the study done by Kellner et al. (2014), showing the position of Barinasuchus within Sebecosuchia.

See also 

 Boverisuchus

References 

Sebecids
Eocene crocodylomorphs
Oligocene crocodylomorphs
Miocene crocodylomorphs
Eocene reptiles of South America
Oligocene reptiles of South America
Miocene reptiles of South America
Laventan
Colloncuran
Friasian
Santacrucian
Colhuehuapian
Deseadan
Tinguirirican
Divisaderan
Paleogene Argentina
Fossils of Argentina
Neogene Peru
Fossils of Peru
Neogene Venezuela
Fossils of Venezuela
Fossil taxa described in 2007
Prehistoric pseudosuchian genera